Miaenia longicollis is a species of beetle in the family Cerambycidae. It was described by Breuning and Ohbayashi in 1964.

References

Miaenia
Beetles described in 1964